Gervais Yao Kouassi (born 27 May 1987), known as Gervinho, is an Ivorian professional footballer who plays as a forward for Greek Super League club Aris and the Ivory Coast national team.

Gervinho began his career at ASEC Abidjan and Toumodi, before moving to Belgium in 2004 to play for Beveren. Between 2007 and 2011, he played in the French Ligue 1, initially at Le Mans and then at Lille. In his final season in France, he helped his club win the league and the Coupe de France. He was sold to Arsenal in 2011 for £10.8 million and moved to Roma in 2013 for €8 million. In January 2016, Gervinho moved to Hebei China Fortune. In August 2018, he joined Parma Calcio 1913

Gervinho has made over 80 appearances for the Ivorian national team from his debut in 2007, scoring 23 goals. He was part of their squads at five Africa Cup of Nations tournaments and two World Cups.

Club career

Early career 
Gervinho was born in Anyama, Ivory Coast. He began his career in the famed ASEC Abidjan youth academy, where he spent five years. At ASEC Abidjan, he was given the Brazilian Portuguese style nickname "Gervinho", derived from his first name Gervais, by the Brazilian coach who trained ASEC Abidjan. The suffix "-inho", in Portuguese, denotes smallness and/or affection, in this case, effectively meaning "Little Gervais".

Following this, he moved to Ivorian Deuxieme Division Zone Four side Toumodi F.C., where he turned professional.

Beveren 
Gervinho played for two seasons at Belgian side Waasland-Beveren, where he made 61 appearances for the club and scored 14 goals.

Le Mans 
At the end of the 2006–07 season Gervinho moved to Ligue 1 side Le Mans, where he played alongside Ivorian international midfielder Romaric. He scored two goals in his debut season in Ligue 1, with one of them coming against AS Nancy. Gervinho scored 9 times in 59 Ligue 1 appearances over 2 seasons with the French side.

Lille 
On 21 July 2009, Gervinho joined Lille for a reported fee of about €6 million (US$8.5 million) on a three-year contract. Gervinho scored 13 times in 32 appearances in his debut season for the club.  His first goal for Lille came in a 3–2 victory away to US Boulogne on 4 October 2009.

Gervinho had an even more successful second season with Lille. He scored 18 goals in all competitions, 15 in Ligue 1, to help Lille win the Ligue 1 for the first time in 56 years.  His side were also crowned Coupe de France champions, with Gervinho scoring a goal in the 2–0 semi-final victory over Nice on 20 April. At the end of the season, Gervinho was linked with clubs like Arsenal, Paris Saint-Germain, Atlético Madrid and Newcastle United.

Arsenal

2011–12 

On 12 July 2011, Gervinho completed a transfer from Lille to Arsenal for a fee believed to be around £10.8 million. Gervinho was given the number 27 shirt, which was last worn by Ivory Coast teammate Emmanuel Eboué who was already on the verge of leaving the club. He made his debut in a pre-season friendly match against 1. FC Köln, in which he scored a brace within the first 15 minutes. He was sent off on his Premier League debut against Newcastle United for slapping Joey Barton. The game finished 0–0. This resulted in a standard three-match ban for violent conduct. Alan Pardew (manager of Newcastle United) accused Gervinho of diving when Cheick Tioté challenged him inside the box. He scored his first league goal in a 4–3 loss to Blackburn Rovers. On 23 October 2011 Gervinho followed this up by contributing to all three goals in Arsenal's 3–1 win over Stoke City, scoring the first and assisting both of Robin van Persie's goals. He then scored his third goal for Arsenal on 3 December 2011, in a 4–0 win at Wigan Athletic, scoring the third goal of the match in a comfortable victory. He scored his fourth goal of his time at Arsenal on 27 December 2011 in the 1–1 draw against Wolves. Gervinho then departed for the Africa Cup of Nations after a 2–1 defeat to Fulham. Gervinho made his return on 18 February 2012 in the FA Cup match against Sunderland which ended in a 2–0 defeat that knocked Arsenal out of the 2011–12 FA Cup.

2012–13 
Gervinho played in three of the first four league games of the season and scored a double in the 6–1 home victory over Southampton on 15 September.  Gervinho scored his first Champions League goal of the new season in a 2–1 victory over Ligue 1 champions HSC Montpellier on 18 September.

On 16 March, Gervinho sealed a 2–0 win at Swansea City by scoring his first goal for Arsenal since September. On 30 March, Gervinho scored a goal and assisted two others as Arsenal beat Reading 4–1 and was named as man of the match.

Roma 

On 8 August 2013, Arsenal sold Gervinho to Italian club A.S. Roma for €8 million. He made his first appearance for Roma as a substitute against Livorno on 25 August. It took until 25 September for Gervinho to score his first official goal for Roma, finishing from close range after an assist from Francesco Totti, which sealed a 2–0 defeat of Sampdoria. In the following Serie A match, he helped Roma record six straight victories to begin the season by netting two goals in their 5–0 defeat of Bologna.

In the quarter-final round of the Coppa Italia on 21 January 2014, Gervinho netted the game's only goal with an acrobatic finish from a Kevin Strootman pass to advance past Juventus and into the semi-finals. In the first leg of their semi-final tie with Napoli on 5 February, Gervinho netted twice, including a late game-winning goal to send Roma into the second leg with a 3–2 advantage.

On 30 August 2014, Gervinho scored in the Roma's second goal in a 2–0 win over Fiorentina to start the 2014–15 season. He scored his first goals in European competition for Roma on 17 September 2014, netting twice in the 5–1 Champions League group stage victory over CSKA Moscow.

Hebei China Fortune 
In January 2016, Gervinho moved to newly promoted Chinese Super League team Hebei China Fortune for a reported initial fee of €18 million. On 4 March 2016, Gervinho scored on his competitive debut in a 1–2 away win against Guangzhou R&F on the opening game of the 2016 Chinese Super League.

In October 2016, Gervinho ruptured the ligaments in his left knee whilst in training for Hebei China Fortune. As a result of this, he missed the 2017 Africa Cup of Nations.

Parma 
On 17 August 2018, Gervinho returned to Serie A by signing for Parma Calcio 1913 alongside his former Roma teammate Salih Uçan. He made his Parma debut as a substitute in a 1–0 away loss to S.P.A.L. nine days later, and on 1 September he scored on his first start for the club, a 2–1 home defeat to reigning champions Juventus. Three weeks afterwards, he scored a "staggering goal" in a 2–0 home win over Cagliari by running with the ball up the whole pitch. In Serie A round 22, on 2 February 2019, he scored two goals to earn a draw for Parma against Juventus in final score 3–3.

In October 2019 he extended his contract with Parma until 30 June 2022.

Trabzonspor
On 26 May 2021, it was announced that Gervinho had joined Turkish side Trabzonspor on a permanent basis. He scored on his Süper Lig debut for the club, a 5–1 win over Yeni Malatyaspor on 16 August.

Aris Thessaloniki
On 15 July 2022, he signed for Aris in Super League Greece.

International career 

Gervinho captained Ivory Coast at U23 level.

He was named in the Ivorian senior squad for the first time for the friendlies against Angola and Qatar in November 2007, and was picked for the Ivorian squad for their 2008 African Cup of Nations campaign in Ghana where he was given the number 10 shirt. He made his competitive debut for the Ivorian club during the 2008 Nations Cup where he made two substitute appearances.

He represented his country at the 2008 Olympic tournament where he was captain. After Ivory Coast lost to Argentina in the first match, Gervinho scored one goal and set up two others in a 4–2 victory over Serbia.

Africa Cup of Nations

2010

On 15 January 2010, Gervinho scored his third international goal in the African Nations Cup group stage game against Ghana. He made a total of three appearances in the tournament, scoring once.

2012
Gervinho missed a sudden-death penalty in the shoot-out at the 2012 Africa Cup of Nations Final, after which Stopila Sunzu scored to win the tournament for Zambia.

2015
In the Ivory Coast's opening match at the 2015 Africa Cup of Nations in Equatorial Guinea, Gervinho was sent off for striking Guinea's Naby Keïta during a 1–1 draw at the Nuevo Estadio de Malabo. He was given a two-match ban for the incident. Gervinho returned for the Ivory Coast's quarter-final against Algeria, scoring the last goal of a 3–1 win, and also netted in a semi-final victory of the same score against the DR Congo.

FIFA World Cup

2010
Gervinho made only three appearances, all as a substitute, in qualifying for the 2010 World Cup but still scored twice. On 15 June 2010, he played his first match in a World Cup. He played 82 minutes in Ivory Coast's opening match in Group G against Portugal, which ended 0–0. In total he made three appearances in the World Cup.

2014
Gervinho was included in Ivory Coast's 23-man squad for the 2014 FIFA World Cup. In their first group match against Japan, he scored the team's winning goal from Serge Aurier's cross in a 2–1 win. In the next match, he scored the only goal for Les Éléphants as they were defeated 2–1 by Colombia in Brasília.

Style of play 
Gervinho is generally deployed as a forward, more often on the wing, and takes a more attacking role than a typical midfielder. A quick, powerful, energetic, and agile player, he possesses good ball control and dribbling skills, which, coupled with his short, fast bursts of pace and sudden changes of direction, lead him to be considered a very direct player. Playing from the left allows him to cut in onto his favoured right foot to shoot. Although in a 4–4–2 formation, Gervinho can take on a more central role, but for both club and country is often utilized on either wing in a 4–3–3 formation.

Rudi Garcia, who managed Gervinho at Lille and Roma, has described him as a player who needs confidence and who makes opportunities for his teammates.

Career statistics

Club

International goals 
Scores and results list Ivory Coast goal tally first.

Honours 
Lille
 Ligue 1: 2010–11
 Coupe de France: 2010–11

Trabzonspor
 Süper Lig: 2021–22

Ivory Coast
 Africa Cup of Nations: 2015

Individual
 Prix Marc-Vivien Foé: 2010, 2011
 UNFP Ligue 1 Team of the Year: 2010–11
 Africa Cup of Nations Team of the Tournament: 2015

References

External links 

 
 
 Gervinho  at Arsenal.com
 
 
 Gervinho at Eurosport.fr
 Gervinho at Football.fr
 
 
 

1987 births
Living people
Footballers from Abidjan
Ivorian footballers
Association football forwards
ASEC Mimosas players
Toumodi FC players
K.S.K. Beveren players
Le Mans FC players
Lille OSC players
Arsenal F.C. players
A.S. Roma players
Hebei F.C. players
Parma Calcio 1913 players
Trabzonspor footballers
Aris Thessaloniki F.C. players
Belgian Pro League players
Ligue 1 players
Premier League players
Serie A players
Chinese Super League players
Süper Lig players
Super League Greece players
Ivory Coast under-20 international footballers
Olympic footballers of Ivory Coast
Ivory Coast international footballers
2008 Africa Cup of Nations players
Footballers at the 2008 Summer Olympics
2010 Africa Cup of Nations players
2010 FIFA World Cup players
2012 Africa Cup of Nations players
2013 Africa Cup of Nations players
2014 FIFA World Cup players
2015 Africa Cup of Nations players
Africa Cup of Nations-winning players
Ivorian expatriate footballers
Ivorian expatriate sportspeople in Belgium
Ivorian expatriate sportspeople in France
Ivorian expatriate sportspeople in England
Ivorian expatriate sportspeople in Italy
Ivorian expatriate sportspeople in China
Ivorian expatriate sportspeople in Turkey
Ivorian expatriate sportspeople in Greece
Expatriate footballers in Belgium
Expatriate footballers in France
Expatriate footballers in England
Expatriate footballers in Italy
Expatriate footballers in China
Expatriate footballers in Turkey
Expatriate footballers in Greece